Israel Dairy Board (Mo'etzet HeHalav) plans and coordinates the management of  dairy farming in the State of Israel.

History
The Israel Dairy Board was registered as a limited company in November 1965. It was established by the Israeli Cabinet to make decisions essential for proper functioning of the country's dairy industry. It serves as an umbrella organization for all parties involved in producing dairy products in Israel: the Israeli government (which passes regulations), the farmers' organizations, the cattle farmers, and the dairies.

See also
Agriculture in Israel
The Cottage cheese boycott

External Links
Israel Dairy Board

Dairy farming in Israel
1965 establishments in Israel
Dairy organizations
Agricultural organizations based in Israel